The 1958 French Grand Prix was a Formula One motor race held at Reims on 6 July 1958. It was race 6 of 11 in the 1958 World Championship of Drivers and race 5 of 10 in the 1958 International Cup for Formula One Manufacturers.

The race was won by Mike Hawthorn driving a Ferrari 246 F1; it was his first Formula One victory since the 1954 Spanish Grand Prix and would prove to be his last. It was also the last Formula One race for five-time World Champion Juan Manuel Fangio. On the final lap, Hawthorn eased up to let Fangio, running fifth at the time, finish on the lead lap of his last race. This turned out to be a blessing, as Peter Collins crashed on the final lap, allowing Fangio to secure fourth.

The race was marred by Ferrari driver Luigi Musso's fatal accident at the Muizon hairpin. His car hurtled off course and crashed into a ditch. Musso was thrown out of the car, was critically injured and died later that day at a hospital near the track.

Of the 21 starters, six died in racing cars within the next three years. Musso died in the race itself, while Peter Collins died in that year's German Grand Prix, Lewis-Evans at the Moroccan Grand Prix, Jean Behra in a support race for the 1959 German Grand Prix, Harry Schell in practice for the 1960 BRDC International Trophy, and Wolfgang von Trips and a dozen spectators died at the 1961 Italian Grand Prix.

Classification

Qualifying

Race

Notes
 – Includes 1 point for fastest lap

Championship standings after the race

Drivers' Championship standings

Constructors' Championship standings

 Notes: Only the top five positions are included for both sets of standings.

References

French Grand Prix
French Grand Prix
1958 in French motorsport